Heteropsis cowani is a butterfly in the family Nymphalidae. It is found on Madagascar, where it is only known from the forests near Fianarantsoa. The habitat consists of forests.

References

Elymniini
Butterflies described in 1880
Endemic fauna of Madagascar
Butterflies of Africa
Taxa named by Arthur Gardiner Butler